HMCS Quinte (hull number MCB 149) was a  that served in the Royal Canadian Navy during the Cold War. Entering service in 1954, the minesweeper was the second ship to bear the name. The ship was taken out of service in 1964 and declared surplus in 1965.

Design and description
The Bay class were designed and ordered as replacements for the Second World War-era minesweepers that the Royal Canadian Navy operated at the time.

They had a complement of 38 officers and ratings.

The Bay-class minesweepers were powered by two GM 12-cylinder diesel engines driving two shafts creating . The ships were armed with one 40 mm Bofors gun and were equipped with minesweeping gear.

Operational history
The ship's keel was laid down on 14 June 1952 by Port Arthur Shipbuilding at their yard in Port Arthur, Ontario. Named for a bay in Ontario, Quinte was launched on 8 August 1953. The ship was commissioned on 15 October 1954.

The First Canadian Minesweeping Squadron, of which Quinte was assigned, sailed to the Caribbean Sea in April 1955 for a training cruise, making several port visits. Quinte and three other ships of the Bay class comprised the First Minesweeping Squadron in 1960. In October 1960, Quinte was among the minesweepers that took part in the NATO naval exercise Sweep Clear V off Shelburne, Nova Scotia. The vessel remained in service until paid off on 26 February 1964. The minesweeper was declared surplus in 1965.

References

Notes

Citations

References
 
 
 
 
 

 

Bay-class minesweepers
Ships built in Ontario
1953 ships
Cold War minesweepers of Canada
Minesweepers of the Royal Canadian Navy